The Northam Stakes is a Northam Racing Club Group 3 Thoroughbred horse race held under Set weights with penalties conditions for three-year-olds and older, over a distance of 1100 metres at Northam Racecourse, Northam, Western Australia, Australia in May. Prize money is A$120,000.

History
The race was titled the Northam Sprint from its inception in 2007 until 2012 when it was renamed the Northam Stakes.

Grade
2012–2017 - Listed Race
2018 -  Group 3

Distance
2007–2008 - 1300 metres
2009 onwards - 1100 metres

Venue
2020 - Ascot Racecourse

Winners

 2022 - Elite Street
2021 – Cup Night 
2020 – Fabergino 
2019 – Rock Magic 
2018 – Battle Hero 
2017 – First Among Equals 
2016 – Magnifisio 
2015 – Dawn Approach 
2014 – Magnifisio 
2013 – Beach Express 
2012 – Barakey 
2011 – Power Princess 
2010 – Kid Choisir 
2009 – Vain Raider 
2008 – Money Exchange
2007 – Certain Gold

See also
 List of Australian Group races
 Group races

References

Horse races in Australia